Last Parade is the only studio album by American hard rock band Call Me No One. The album was recorded and mixed at Architekt Music in Butler, New Jersey and it was released on June 5, 2012. The album is to be on 7Bros. record company, with Asylum as a distributor.

Recording and production
The album was recorded and mixed at Architekt Music in Butler, New Jersey. During an interview with Loudwire.com Lowery says about the album "Me and Morgan are writing and recording it, we have a really good team with us. It's a lot different from Sevendust, it's hard but it's not the same type of heavy that Sevendust is and we're really excited about it. Then he added "it's gonna be on the same label that releases Sevendust, the 7 Bros. record company, with Asylum as a distributor. It's really cool; we've wanted this opportunity to do something different, it's exciting to finally have the opportunity to do this. The band launched their official website with a new design to promote the album. They also posted some videos on YouTube showing how the album was created. On May 14 a clip of track titled "War Song" was released. Plus the band streamed a clip of title track "Last Parade" on various internet websites. Prior to the album's release, Lowery released videos of himself discussing preview clips from the album.

Reception
Last Parade has received positive reviews from critics. Writing for Sputnikmusic, Rick Florino said that Last Parade "illuminates just how dynamic and diverse Clint Lowery and Morgan Rose truly are." Chris Colgan of Popmatters wrote "Lowery's singing style is the perfect fit for Call Me No One, filling out the sound in a way that virtually no other singer could." Loudwire gave the album 4 out of 5, stating, "Clint Lowery and Morgan Rose have created a piece of work that is far different from Sevendust but  is powerful all on its own. Their hard work, frustration and passion can all be heard throughout the album."

Track listing

Personnel

Call Me No One
 Clint Lowery – lead vocals, guitars, bass
 Morgan Rose – drums, percussions

Additional personnel 
 Kurt Wubbenhorst – additional bass, programming
 Dante Portella – banjo
 George Roskos – executive producer
 Mike Ferretti – engineer, mixing
 Johnny Fantozzi – assistant engineer
 Ted Jensen – mastering
 Jeremy Adamos – photography
 Douglas Mackenzie – photography
 Andrea Smith – design
 Blake Plonsky – drum technician

Charts

References

Call Me No One albums
2012 albums
Asylum Records albums